"Blame" is the 2002 single recorded by the German group Sono, taken from the album "Solid State," produced by Martin Weiland and Florian Sikorski, with lyrics written by Weiland and vocals performed by Lennart Solomon. The single was the follow up to their 2000 debut "Keep Control", and like their first single this too also reached No. 1 on the Billboard Hot Dance Club Play Chart the week of July 13, 2002, where it held that position for one week. It would also be their final single to chart in the United States. In Germany, the single peaked at No. 65, their best showing on that country's pop chart.

Official versions
12" (U.S.)
 "Blame (Gomi's Revenge Mix)" - 8:39
 "Blame (Gomi's Revenge Dub)" - 5:40
 "Blame (Guido Osorio Main Mix)" - 7:48
 "Blame (Guido Osorio Dub Mix)" - 7:01

CD Maxi (Germany)
 "Blame (Edit)" - 3:56
 "Blame (Extended)" - 8:42
 "Red Sky (Nor Elle's Sundown Remix)" - 6:29

References

External links
 Official video on YouTube

2002 singles
2000 songs
Sono (band) songs
Songs about loneliness